Valkeakoski (lit. "white rapids") is a town and municipality in Finland. The municipality has a population of 
which 
is water. The population density is
.

The municipality is unilingually Finnish.

Valkeakoski is best known for its paper industry and domestically highly successful football team, FC Haka.

The town and the paper industry have both grown by the Valkeakoski rapids between the lake Mallasvesi in the north and the lake Vanajavesi in the south.

History 

The Valkeakoski area is known to have been inhabited since the Iron Age. More than a thousand years ago, the ridges on the area served as a foundation of the Rapola fort. In the following Middle Ages, the mill town Sääksmäki was the center of the area. However, industrialization towards the end of the 19th century increased the importance of what became the contemporary town of Valkeakoski. The channel of Valkeakoski was opened in 1869, and the first paper mill was completed in 1873, marking the beginning of a continuing tradition of the forest industry. The municipality of Sääksmäki, from which the town of Valkeakoski was detached in 1923 was consolidated with Valkeakoski in 1973.

Districts, neighborhoods and villages

Countryside and villages
The entire countryside of Valkeakoski consists mainly of the former Sääksmäki municipality areas.

 Sääksmäki (consists of Huittula and Ritvala, Kemmola, Mälkiäinen, Haukila, Uskila, Tykölä, Viranmaa, Kasuri / Koivuniemi / Raija, Metsäkansa, Ylenjoki, Konho, Nikkarinhanko / Muti, Rantoo, Yli-Nissi, Kärjenniemi, Vedentaka, Kaapelinkulma, Kannistonmäki, Viuha, Mattila, Vuorentaka, Valto, Paino, Tarttila, Pyörönmaa and Vanhakylä)

Districts
There are 25 districts in what is considered the urban area of Valkeaskoki. These districts are further divided into neighborhoods. The districts and neighborhoods of Valkeakoski are:

In addition, outside of but in the vicinity of these districts lay Vanhakylä and Viuha.

Sports 

Valkeakoski is notable for the football team FC Haka and also other Haka sections, especially the cross-country skiing section. The "skiing Haka" is one of the most successful skiing teams in Finland. The other major local sports organization Koskenpojat has also been really successful, winning many national championships in aerobic gymnastics.

International relations

Twin towns — sister cities
Valkeakoski is twinned with:

 Gotland, Sweden
 Kragerø, Norway (1954)
 Sokol, Russia (1971)
 Vechelde, Germany (1976)
 Jelenia Góra, Poland (1979) 
 Nanchang, China (1997)
 Mariehamn, Åland Islands, Finland (1999)

Notable persons from Valkeakoski 
 Veikko Hakulinen
 Mika Kallio
 Pentti Linkola
 Iris Sihvonen
 Emil Wikström
 Juhani Peltonen
 Alpo Suhonen
 Antti Muurinen

Notable places and events 
 National Football Museum
 Työväen Musiikkitapahtuma music festival (freely translated as Workers' Music Event)
 Tehtaan kenttä

References

Gallery

External links

Town of Valkeakoski – Official site

 
Populated places established in 1923
1923 establishments in Finland